Henry Wolfe Baines (2 February 1905 – 29 November 1972) was an Anglican bishop.

Early life
Baines was born in 1905 in Kingston, Surrey, the son of Talbot Baines and his wife Agnes (née Talbot). He was educated at St George's School, Windsor Castle, Repton School and Balliol College, Oxford. He was then a travelling secretary for the Student Christian Movement (1927-1929).

Clerical career
After theological studies at Cuddesdon College he was ordained deacon in 1930 and priest in 1931, and began his ordained ministry as a curate at the University Church of St Mary the Virgin (1930-1934). From 1934 he was chaplain of St. John's Cathedral, Hong Kong, then Vicar of St Nicholas' Church, Radford, Coventry (1938-1941) and finally, before his ordination to the episcopate, the Rector of St Andrew's Church, Rugby (1941-1949) and Rural Dean of Rugby (1947-1949). In 1949 he became Bishop of Singapore. He was consecrated bishop on 29 June 1949, by Geoffrey Fisher, Archbishop of Canterbury, at St Paul's Cathedral (London, UK). In 1960 he was translated to be the Bishop of Wellington; he died in office.

References

1905 births
People educated at Repton School
Alumni of Balliol College, Oxford
Alumni of Ripon College Cuddesdon
Anglican bishops of Singapore
Anglican bishops of Wellington
Hong Kong chaplains
1972 deaths
Anglican chaplains
British chaplains
British expatriates in Hong Kong
British people in British Malaya
British expatriates in New Zealand
20th-century Anglican bishops in Asia
20th-century Anglican bishops in New Zealand
Anglican bishops of West Malaysia